Tiombe Hurd (born August 17, 1973, in Seattle, Washington) is an American triple jumper. After winning the 2004 US Olympic Trials, she represented her native country at the 2004 Olympic Games in Athens, Greece, where she didn't reach the final. Her personal best jump is 14.45 metres, achieved in July 2004 in Sacramento. This was the American record at the time.

Competition record

References

 
 

1973 births
Living people
American female triple jumpers
Track and field athletes from Seattle
Olympic track and field athletes of the United States
Athletes (track and field) at the 2004 Summer Olympics
Pan American Games track and field athletes for the United States
Athletes (track and field) at the 1999 Pan American Games
Athletes (track and field) at the 2003 Pan American Games
Goodwill Games medalists in athletics
Competitors at the 1995 Summer Universiade
AAA Championships winners
Competitors at the 1998 Goodwill Games
Competitors at the 2001 Goodwill Games
21st-century American women